The 1893 All-Ireland Senior Football Championship was the seventh staging of Ireland's premier Gaelic football knock-out competition. The previous 2 years All Ireland champions Dublin didn't take part in the Leinster Championship called off game against Kilkenny. Wexford were the champions.

Results

Leinster

Kilkenny refused to take the field for the second half in protest at rough play by the Wexford team. Wexford were awarded the Leinster title.

Munster

All-Ireland final

Championship statistics

Miscellaneous
 Wexford win their first of both All Ireland and Leinster titles.
 Connacht and Ulster counties withdraw until 1899.

References

All-Ireland Senior Football Championship